The Kingdom of Commagene was a small Macedo-Iranian kingdom in southern Anatolia near Antioch, which began life as a tributary state of the Seleucid Empire and later became an independent kingdom, before eventually being annexed by the Roman Empire in 72.

Satraps of Commagene, 290–163 BC
 Sames 290–260 BC
 Arsames I 260–228 BC
 Xerxes of Armenia 228–212 BC
 Ptolemaeus of Commagene 201–163 BC

Kings of Commagene, 163 BC – 72 AD
Ptolemaeus of Commagene 163–130 BC
Sames II Theosebes Dikaios 130–109 BC
Mithridates I Callinicus 109–70 BC
Antiochus I Theos of Commagene 70–38 BC
Mithridates II of Commagene 38–20 BC
Mithridates III of Commagene 20–12 BC
Antiochus III of Commagene 12 BC – 17 AD
Ruled by Rome 17–38
Antiochus IV of Commagene 38–72 and wife, Julia Iotapa

Descendants of the Kings of Commagene
 Gaius Julius Antiochus Epiphanes Philopappos
 Julia Balbilla
 Gaius Julius Agrippa
 Gaius Julius Alexander Berenicianus
 Julia (sister to Berenicianus), who married consul Gaius Julius Quadratus Bassus
 Jotapianus, possibly

References

Sources 
 

Commagene
Commagene 
Commagene